Banksia aurantia, commonly known as the orange dryandra, is a shrub that is endemic to Western Australia. It has underground stems, deeply divided leaves with 18 to 28 lobes on each sides, about eighty pale orange-pink flowers in each inflorescence, and egg-shaped follicles.

Description

Taxonomy
The orange dryandra was first described as Dryandra aurantia in 1996 by Alex George, who collected the type material with Margaret Pieroni on 26 April 1994 at Little Darkin Swamp southwest of York. CALM worker Len Talbot had discovered the species in 1991. It was transferred to the genus Banksia by Austin Mast and Kevin Thiele in 2007 when Dryandra was sunk into Banksia. Its species name is from the Latin aurantia "orange".

Distribution and habitat
All known populations of B. aurantia lie within Wandoo National Park, at Little Darkin Swamp southeast of York. The species grows on flat, seasonally wet, low-lying areas of grey or white sand. The habitat is open woodland, and associated species include Hakea prostrata, candlestick banksia (Banksia attenuata), holly pea (Jacksonia floribunda) and Melaleuca species.

Conservation status
Banksia aurantia has been declared critically endangered under the federal Environment Protection and Biodiversity Conservation Act 1999, and rare under Western Australia's Wildlife Conservation Act 1950. There are three extant populations located within an area of approximately 4.5 square km and covering less than 0.1 square km.

References

aurantia
Endemic flora of Western Australia
Eudicots of Western Australia
Plants described in 1996
Taxa named by Kevin Thiele